The Gun is an automated basketball shooting machine and rebounding tool used by basketball players to enhance their shooting skills. "These high-tech machines are placed under a basket where they catch shots and throw the ball back to players."   It allows for players to take more shots in less time, while it "enhances muscle memory through repetition by keeping players moving and catching, shooting and moving to the next spot on the court."

History

The Gun was invented by John Joseph in 1998, although the first basketball Gun was not purchased until 1999 by the University of Florida. As of 2020, almost 28,000 basketball Guns are being used by high schools, colleges, and the NBA.  Joseph had previously invented a non-automated rebounding device known as the "Shoot-A-Way,"  for which he filed a patent for in 1984.  Like the Shoot-A-Way, the Gun has a "collection net [that] can be adjusted from 11 feet to 14 feet to force players to shoot with the right amount of arch depending on where they are shooting from."  Although unlike the Shoot-A-Way, which used tracks to return the ball to the player, the Gun returns the ball by shooting the ball back to the player at a previously set speed and time, this function allows for the player to take up to 1800 shots every hour.  This function also allows for a ball to be passed every two seconds, which allows a player to take 200 shots in 10 minutes.  Currently there are two models of the basketball Gun invented by John Joseph; the Gun 6000 and the Gun 8000.

The Gun 6000

The Gun 6000 is the basic model invented by John Joseph in 1998. The Gun rebounds the player’s missed or made shots, and then it passes the ball back to the player for another shot. This model includes "a timing device so [players] can determine the distance and the speed of [their] return passes."  The Gun 6000 also keeps track of shots taken, shots made, and the percentage of made shots.

The Gun 8000

The Gun 8000 is a more advanced model invented by John Joseph, which was released on September 1, 2009. This model includes several new features including: a touch pad of where the player wants the pass directed, a time delay button, the ability to input a set number of passes from a given spot before the Gun moves to the next one, as well as a button that won’t allow the machine to move to the next spot until the player has made a set number of shots from his/her current spot. The Gun 8000 also allows the user to print out a receipt of his/her makes, attempts, and percentage.

The Gun 10K

The Gun 10K is Shoot-A-Way's most advanced basketball shooting machine invented by John Joseph and released in 2017. This model has a touchscreen to select where the player wants the pass directed, time delay in between each pass, the ability to input a set number of passes from a given spot before The Gun moves on to the next one, as well as the ability to pick the order in which The Gun will pass to the locations. The Gun 10K also has an optional built in Bluetooth speaker system to play music through the players phone during a workout. The Gun 10K comes standard with the ability to track workout stats through the free Shoot-A-Way app.

References

Basketball equipment
1998 introductions
1998 in basketball